Melika Foroutan (born 1976) is a German-Iranian actress.

Biography

Melika Foroutan, born 1976 in Tehran, initially studied Philosophy, English and History in Cologne from 1995 to 1998. She then enrolled in the acting class of the University of Arts (UdK) in Berlin where she graduated in 2002. In the three following years she joined the company at the Schauspielhaus Leipzig.

She had breakout roles in 2006 with the drama "Wut" ("Anger") and as police officer Silvia Henke in the critically acclaimed TV show “KDD – Kriminaldauerdienst”. In 2015 she was awarded best actress at the Hessischer Filmpreis for her role in “Louise Boni”.

The 70th Filmfest Berlin presented Melika in the title role of "Pari" directed by Siamak Etemadi in the Section Panorama. When Iranian Pari arrives in Athens with her husband, her son is not at the airport as planned. Pari sets off in search of him and gets deeply caught up in the fabric of this foreign city.

As of January 2013, Foroutan was living in Berlin with a male partner from Dortmund.

Filmography
Source:

 2000: Für dich mein Herz 
 2004: Blond: Eva Blond! – Der Zwerg im Schließfach
 2004: Das Zimmermädchen und der Millionär 
 2006: Vogel im Käfig 
 2006: Alles über Anna 
 2006: Krieg der Frauen 
 2006: Wut 
 2007: Bittersüsses Nichts 
 2007: Drei Reisende (Kurzfilm)
 2007–2010: KDD – Kriminaldauerdienst
 2008:  – 
 2008: Die dunkle Seite 
 2008: Lutter – Ein toter Bruder
 2008: Palermo Shooting
 2009: Der Kapitän – Packeis
 2009: 66/67: Fairplay Is Over
 2009: Flemming – Der Tag ohne gestern
 2010: Stolberg (TV series) – Familienbande
 2011: 
 2011: Von Mäusen und Lügen 
 2011: Der Duft von Holunder 
 2011: 
 2011: Es ist nicht vorbei 
 2011: Unter Verdacht – Persönliche Sicherheiten
 2011: Und dennoch lieben wir – Regie: Matthias Tiefenbacher (Fernsehfilm) 
 2012: Das Ende einer Nacht 
 2012: Schief gewickelt
 2013: Die Kronzeugin – Mord in den Bergen (Fernsehfilm)
 2013: Weissensee
 2013: Unter Feinden
 2014: Das Attentat Sarajevo 1914  
 2014: Das Lächeln der Frauen 
 2014: Die Mamba
 2014: Louise Boni – Mord im Zeichen des Zen
2015: Louise Boni – Jäger in der Nacht 
2016: Der gute Bulle 
2017: Reich oder Tot
2018: Wiener Blut
2019: Tribes of Europa
2020: Il Pastore
2020: Mediterranéo
2022: The Empress
2022: Die Kaiserin

Awards
 2015 Hessischer Fernsehpreis for her role in Begierde – Mord im Zeichen des Zen.

References

External links 

 

1976 births
German film actresses
German television actresses
21st-century German actresses
People from Rhein-Hunsrück-Kreis
People from Tehran
German Film Award winners
Iranian people of German descent
Iranian emigrants to Germany
Actresses from Berlin
University of Cologne alumni
Berlin University of the Arts alumni
Living people